Eaux Claires is a residential neighbourhood located in north east Edmonton, Alberta, Canada.  It is bounded on the north by 167 Avenue, on the west by 97 Street, and on the south by 153 Avenue.  The east boundary runs along a line located between 89 Street and 90 Street.  Travel north along 97 Street takes residents to CFB Edmonton while travel south along 97 Street takes residents past the Northern Alberta Institute of Technology and into the downtown core.

Housing in the neighbourhood is a mixture of single-family houses (55.7%), walk-up apartment style condominiums (32.6%), and duplexes (11.7%).  The majority of residential dwelling units are owner-occupied.

Demographics 

Eaux Claires Transit Centre 

The Eaux Claires Transit Centre  is situated along 97 street at 157 avenue. It has several amenities including bike racks, park and ride (300 spaces), a drop off area, vending machines and washrooms.

The transit centre opened on August 26, 2011 with a construction cost of $12 million, in which $4 million was provided by both the provincial and federal governments.

The following bus routes serve the transit centre:

See also 
Edmonton Transit Service

References

External links 

 Eaux Claires Demographic Profile

Neighbourhoods in Edmonton
Edmonton Transit Service transit centres